Vasiliy Gorshkov (born 5 February 1977) is a Russian pole vaulter.

He finished eighth at the 2002 European Athletics Championships and fourth at the 2003 IAAF World Indoor Championships. He also competed at the 2001 World Championships in Athletics, but failed to qualify from his pool.

His personal best jump is 5.80 metres, achieved in July 2002 in Cheboksary. He has not competed on top level since 2004.

References

1977 births
Living people
Russian male pole vaulters
World Athletics Championships athletes for Russia
Russian Athletics Championships winners